Aval may refer to:
 Aval (1967 film)
 Aval (1972 film)
 Aval (2017 film)
 Aval (TV series), a 2011 Indian Tamil-language family soap opera